Ascopariidae is a family of flatworms.

Genera

Ascoparia
Contains the following species:
 Ascoparia neglecta Sterrer, 1998
 Ascoparia secunda Sterrer, 1998

Flagellophora
Contains the following species:
 Flagellophora apelti Faubel & Dorjes 1978

References

Acoelomorphs